Tampico is a city and port in Tamaulipas, Mexico. 

Tampico may also refer to:

Places
Tampico, Illinois, a village in Tampico Township
Tampico, Indiana, United States
Tampico, Ohio, an unincorporated community
Tampico, Washington, United States
 Center, Indiana, originally called Tampico
Libramiento Poniente de Tampico (or Tampico Western Bypass or the Maxi Libramiento Tampico), a section of the Mexican Federal Highway 70D operated by Caminos y Puentes
Pueblo Viejo Municipality, Veracruz, Pueblo Viejo de Tampico
Peoria to Tampico/Dixon, a section of the Ronald Reagan Trail
Tampico Alto, a town in the Mexican state of Veracruz
Tampico Bridge, connecting the states of Tamaulipas and Veracruz, Mexico
Tampico International Airport (IATA: TAM, ICAO: MMTM), an international airport located at Tampico, Tamaulipas, Mexico
Tampico metropolitan area, the third most populous metropolitan area in the state of Tamaulipas, in the country of Mexico
Tampico Mounds, a prehistoric archaeological site located in Fulton County, Illinois near the community of Maples Mill
Tampico Road, a section of Illinois Route 172
Tampico Township, Whiteside County, Illinois, United States

Arts, entertainment, and media
 "Tampico" (song), a 1945 song by Stan Kenton with June Christy on vocals
 "Tampico", a 1973 song by Heino
Tampico (film), a 1944 film starring Edward G. Robinson and Lynn Bari
Tampico, a 1926 novel by Joseph Hergesheimer

Brands and enterprises
Grupo Tampico, one of the largest companies in northeastern Mexico
Tampico Beverages, a supplier of juice drink concentrates

Education
Educación Profesional de Tampico, AC (Tampico's Professional Education or Autonomous University of Tamaulipas), a Mexican public university
Instituto Cultural Tampico (ICT, a K-12 private school founded in 1962 by the Society of Jesus in the city of Tampico, Mexico
Monterrey Institute of Technology and Higher Education, Tampico, in Mexico
Tampico High School also known Prophetstown High School, serves the Prophetstown-Lyndon-Tampico Community Unit School District 3, for the communities of Prophetstown, Lyndon, Tampico, Deer Grove, and Yorktown
The American School of Tampico, an elementary, middle and high school in Tampico, Mexico

Military

Tampico, a Mexican Navy gunboat involved in the First Battle of Topolobampo on March 4, 1914, during the Mexican Revolution
Battle of Tampico (1829), the port town was seized by 3,000 Spanish troops from Havana during the Spanish attempts to reconquer Mexico
 Battle of Tampico (1839) or "Siege of Tampico", a siege that lasted from 26 May until 4 June 1839 during the Mexican Federalist War
 Battle of Tampico (1863), was a victory for the Republicans on 19 January during the French intervention in Mexico 
Tampico Affair (1914), an incident involving U.S. sailors and Mexican land forces loyal to Mexican dictator General Victoriano Huerta
 Tampico Expedition (1835), an expedition for the purpose of supporting Federalist opposition to the Centralist government of Mexico, which involved the "Battle of Tampico" fought November 15, 1835, in the Mexican state of Tamaulipas

Religion
Roman Catholic Diocese of Tampico
Tampico Amish Mennonites, a Plain, car-driving branch of the Amish Mennonites also known as "Kauffman Amish Mennonites", "Sleeping Preacher Churches", or "Tampico Amish Mennonite Churches"
Tampico Cathedral, a Roman Catholic Church also known as Immaculate Conception Cathedral(Catedral de la Inmaculada Concepción or Catedral de Tampico costado Oriente, in Tampico, Mexico
Tampico Mexico Temple, located in Ciudad Madero, part of the Tampico conurbation

Sports
Abierto Tampico, a tournament for professional female tennis players played on outdoor hard courts
2014 Abierto Tampico – Singles
2015 Abierto Tampico
2016 Abierto Tampico
2017 Abierto Tampico – Singles
Alijadores de Tampico (Tampico Lightermen), a former professional baseball club based in Tampico, Tamaulipas that played in the Mexican League
Tampico Madero F.C., or Tampico Madero Fútbol Club, a football (soccer) club that currently plays in the Ascenso, MX

Other uses
1933 Tampico hurricane, a Category 5 hurricane
Istle, or Tampico, a type of hard plant fiber obtained from a number of Mexican plants used in the manufacture of brushes, cords, and ropes
TB-9 Tampico GT, one of the models of the Socata TB series of aircraft
Tampico fiber from northern mexico, used to make bristles on brushes, ropes, and other uses.